Nana Araki (荒木 菜那 Araki Nana, born May 3, 2002) is a Japanese figure skater. She is the 2017 JGP Belarus silver medalist and a two-time national junior medalist.

Early life 
Araki was born in Higashiura, Japan, on May 3, 2002. She began skating in 2008.

Career 
Araki won the silver medal in her Junior Grand Prix debut, at Minsk, Belarus, in September 2017. She was fourth at her second Junior Grand Prix event in Italy. Later that year, in November, she won the bronze medal at the Japan Junior National Championships behind Rika Kihira and Mako Yamashita. Due to her high placement, she was also able to compete at the senior National Championships, where she placed 13th. She ended her season with a gold medal at the Challenge Cup in March, 2018.

Araki started her 2018-19 season on the Junior Grand Prix in the Czech Republic, where she placed fifth. She repeated her placement at her second event in Armenia. In November 2018, at the Japan Junior National Championships, she was the silver medalist behind Yuhana Yokoi. She closed her season at the senior National Championships, where she placed 13th.

For the 2019-20 season, Araki got her short program choreographed by Kenji Miyamoto and her free skate choreographed by Miki Ando, a two-time world champion who Araki looks up to. Araki debuted her programs at the Junior Grand Prix event in Courchavel, France, where she placed 4th. She competed at the Junior Grand Prix event in Russia, where she also placed fourth. She went on to place thirteenth at Japanese Nationals.

For the 2020-21 season, she was assigned to compete at the 2020 NHK Trophy. She placed 11th at the event.

Programs

Competitive highlights 
GP: Grand Prix; JGP: Junior Grand Prix

References

External links 
 

2002 births
Living people
Japanese female single skaters